is a 1999 mecha fighting game by FromSoftware for the Dreamcast.

Similar to FromSoftware's Armored Core series, the mecha in the game are heavily customizable.

The game had a single-player mode, a local two-player mode, and an online two-player mode. The online features were discontinued in January 2001.

Reception

The game received favorable reviews according to the review aggregation website GameRankings. Jeff Lundrigan of NextGen said of the game, "Ah, if only it hadn't twisted our thumbs with the control layout, it would have been true love. As it is, we're stuck with sore hands and a happy infatuation." In Japan, Famitsu gave it a score of 29 out of 40.

References

External links
  

1999 video games
Dreamcast games
Dreamcast-only games
FromSoftware games
Japan-exclusive video games
Video games about mecha
Multiplayer and single-player video games
Video games developed in Japan
Video games scored by Kota Hoshino